The 1955 Cork Senior Football Championship was the 67th staging of the Cork Senior Football Championship since its establishment by the Cork County Board in 1887. 

St. Nicholas' entered the championship as the defending champions.

On 23 October 1955, Lees won the championship following a 3-04 to 0-09 defeat of Macroom in the final at the Cork Athletic Grounds. This was their 12th and final championship title overall and their first title since 1923.

Results

Final

Miscellaneous
 Lees win the title for the first time since 1923.
 Lees win their record final 12th title. They would stay top for the roll of honour until 2002.

References

Cork Senior Football Championship